Daniel Dewar (1788–1867) was a Church of Scotland minister who served as principal of Marischal College in Aberdeen from 1832 to 1860. He was a major contributor to the first Gaelic dictionary. He was father-in-law to James Clerk Maxwell.

Life
Dewar was born in Glen Dochart in 1788. He was educated at Glasgow University and Homerton Independent Academy in Hackney, London. He concluded his studies at Edinburgh University graduating MA in 1815.

In November 1812 he was licensed to preach as a Church of Scotland minister by the Presbytery of Mull. In September 1813 he was ordained as missionary to Strontian. In July 1814 he was given the post as minister of Greyfriars Church, Aberdeen. In May 1817 he began the additional role as Professor of Moral Philosophy at Marischal College (which physically adjoins Greyfriars Church).

Glasgow University awarded him two honorary doctorates: LLD in 1815 and DD in 1832.

In August 1819 he translated to Tron Kirk, Glasgow. He left in 1832 being offered the post of Principal of Marischal College in place of William Laurence Brown, jointly having the role as Professor of Church History.

Although being deeply involved in the lead up to the Disruption of 1843 he ultimately remained in the established church.

From 1855 to 1858 he corresponded with Sir Austen Layard.

He demoted his roles in 1860 when Marischal College merged with King's College, Aberdeen to create the University of Aberdeen. He purchased the estate of Over Durdie in Kilspindie and retired to there, dying on 28 May 1867.

Family

In September 1821 he married Susan Place (d.1876), daughter of Edward Place of Skelton Grange in Yorkshire. They had several children:

Ann Gordon Dewar (b.1822) married John McCunn of Ardhallow in Dunoon
Katherine Mary Dewar (1824-1886), married scientist James Clerk Maxwell
Susan Place Dewar (b.1825)
Edward Place Dewar (b.1827), minister of Auchtergaven
William Gordon Dewar (b.1829)
Donald Dewar (b.1831), minister of Ellon, Aberdeenshire
John Dewar (b.1831) twin of above

Artistic recognition
He was portrayed by Samuel Freeman.

Publications

Observations on the Character, Customs and Superstitions of the Irish (1812)
The Natural State of Man (1816)
A Dictionary of the Gaelic Language (1831) with Rev Norman Macleod

References
 

1788 births
1867 deaths
Alumni of the University of Edinburgh
Academics of the University of Aberdeen
19th-century Ministers of the Church of Scotland